Saint-Laurent-Nouan is a commune in the Loir-et-Cher department, central France.

History
Saint-Laurent-Nouan was formed in 1972 from the merger of the two former communes, Saint-Laurent-des-Eaux and Nouan-sur-Loire.

Population

See also
Communes of the Loir-et-Cher department

References

Communes of Loir-et-Cher
Carnutes